Paul Michael DelVecchio Jr. (born July 5, 1980), known as Pauly D and DJ Pauly D, is an American television personality and DJ. He is best known for being a cast member of MTV's reality show Jersey Shore.

In 2011, he made a three-album deal with 50 Cent's G-Unit Records and G-Note Records. He is the first of the Jersey Shore cast to get his own spin-off show, The Pauly D Project.

Early life
DelVecchio was born on July 5, 1980, in Providence, Rhode Island. He is the son of Donna DiCarlo and Paul D. DelVecchio Sr. He has said that he is of "100% Italian" descent. He has one sister, Vanessa. He began his career as a local DJ under the moniker Pauly D. One of his professional idols was DJ AM.

Career

Jersey Shore

DelVecchio was cast in 2009 for Jersey Shore. He has stated that his being chosen for Jersey Shore had nothing to do with his music, but that they instead sent him a Myspace message after liking his look. After he sent them his number, "The casting directors called me from LA and they said they wanted to send down a camera crew to Rhode Island to film a day in my life. They filmed me at the gym, filmed me tanning and filmed me going to the club. Six months later they said I got on the show. I never really auditioned."

His appearance in the show resulted in popularity with what Time dubbed "seriously rabid fans." He won the 2011 Teen Choice Award for Choice Reality Star: Male. He was a contestant in June 2012 on the Fox show called The Choice.

The Pauly D Project
DelVecchio is the first housemate from Jersey Shore to receive his own spin-off. The show focused on his DJ career as he goes on a tour around America. Filming commenced in 2012. According to Time, "We're guessing Pauly D got the spot [instead of Nicole Polizzi or Michael Sorrentino] because he genuinely seems fun and easy to get along with. He's not known for diva antics like The Situation and doesn't appear a drunken mess at times, like Nicole and Michael do." The show, originally called DelVecchio was later renamed The Pauly D Project. It premiered on MTV on March 29, 2012.

Jersey Shore: Family Vacation
In 2018, DelVecchio rejoined the Jersey Shore castmates for a sequel series, Jersey Shore: Family Vacation set in Miami.

Music and disc jockey career

In 2010, DelVecchio released a single, "Beat Dat Beat (It's Time To)". He was also nominated for the "America's Best DJ" competition in 2010 and 2011.

After numerous rumors, on August 11, 2011, DelVecchio confirmed to XXL that he had signed a three-album deal with 50 Cent's labels G-Unit Records & G-Note Records and that he will also be releasing headphones under the label.

In 2011, DelVecchio announced that he would open for Britney Spears on her Femme Fatale Tour in North America in selected cities.

In July 2012, DelVecchio tweeted that Big Sean was with him in the studio working on his new album, which will be released in 2013.

In August 2012, Wrestling Inc. reported that DelVecchio would be the social media ambassador for SummerSlam.

DelVecchio released his first single of debut album, called "Back to Love", on January 15, 2012, featuring British singer Jay Sean.

In 2016, DelVecchio released a single called "Did You Know" with Tdot illdude.

On April 5, 2019, DelVecchio released his third single called "Silver & Gold" with James Kaye.

Other reality TV appearances
In 2016, DelVecchio joined the cast of Famously Single on the E! network. The show follows eight single celebrities who move in together to examine their romantic problems.

In 2018, he joined the cast Marriage Bootcamp: Reality Stars 11 with Aubrey O'Day. The couple first met while filming Famously Single.

In 2019, DelVecchio was part of the cast of Game of Clones, a dating show where he was looking for a Megan Fox lookalike.

In April 2019, DelVecchio appeared on the MTV reality dating series Double Shot at Love, along with Jersey Shore castmate Vinny Guadagnino.

In 2020, DelVecchio and Vinny Guadagnino were cast on another MTV reality series, Revenge Prank.

In 2022, DelVecchio served as the official narrator for the reality party-competition series All Star Shore on Paramount+.

Personal life
In October 2013, DelVecchio announced that he was the father of a daughter, Amabella Sophia, born in New Jersey.

Discography

Singles

Awards and nominations

References

External links
 
 Pauly D Project at MTV
 

1980 births
Living people
American people of Italian descent
Participants in American reality television series
American DJs
Club DJs
Musicians from Providence, Rhode Island
Electronic dance music DJs
Male television personalities